Cankıllı is a village in the Aksaray District, Aksaray Province, Turkey. Its population is 309 (2021). The village is populated by Zazas.

References

Villages in Aksaray District